Gullas is a surname. Notable people with the surname include:

Eduardo Gullas (born 1930), Filipino politician
Gerald Anthony Gullas Jr. (born 1984), Filipino politician
Paulino Gullas (1891–1945), Filipino lawyer, newspaper publisher, and politician 
Vicente Gullas (1888–1970), Filipino writer, lawyer, and educator